Purdie Good! is an album led by jazz drummer Bernard Purdie which was recorded for the Prestige label in 1971.

Reception

Stewart Mason of Allmusic states, "it seems like Purdie's much-vaunted ability to play well in just about any style thrown at him is almost a liability on 1971's Purdie Good... the covers are competent enough, but why listen to them when the originals are far superior? At best, the album only barely lives up to its title".

Track listing
All compositions by Bernard Purdie except where noted
 "Cold Sweat" (James Brown, Alfred "Pee Wee" Ellis) - 5:30   
 "Montego Bay" (Bobby Bloom, Jeff Barry) - 5:40   
 "Purdie Good" - 6:20   
 "Wasteland" - 6:10   
 "Everybody's Talkin'" (Fred Neil) - 5:14   
 "You Turn Me On" - 6:20

Personnel
Bernard Purdie - drums
Tippy Larkin - trumpet
Charlie Brown, Warren Daniels - tenor saxophone
Harold Wheeler - electric piano
Ted Dunbar, Billy Nichols - guitar
Gordon Edwards - electric bass
Norman Pride - congas

Production
 Bob Porter - producer
 Rudy Van Gelder - engineer

References

Bernard Purdie albums
1971 albums
Prestige Records albums
Albums produced by Bob Porter (record producer)
Albums recorded at Van Gelder Studio